Chula Chakrabongse (28 March 1908 – 30 December 1963), was a member of the family of the Chakri dynasty of Thailand and of the House of Chakkraphong. He was the only child of Prince Chakrabongse Bhuvanath and his Ukrainian wife Catherine Desnitski (later Mom Catherine Na Phitsanulok). He was a grandson of King Chulalongkorn.

Early life 

Prince Chula Chakrabongse was born on 28 March 1908 in Paruskavan Palace, Bangkok, with the title Mom Chao (His Serene Highness). Saovabha Phongsri, his grandmother, gave him the name Phongchak (พงษ์จักร). Later his uncle, King Vajiravudh, raised him the higher rank of Phra Chao Worawong Thoe Phra Ong Chao (His Royal Highness Prince) and changed his name to Chunlachakkraphong. Palace officials affectionately called him "the Little Prince" ( Than Phraong Nu).

When very young, Prince Chula was sent to study in the United Kingdom, where he spent his teenage years, attending Harrow School. He graduated with Bachelor and Master from Trinity College, University of Cambridge.

There is a granite drinking bowl at Mitchem's Corner in Cambridge, donated in 1934 in memory of Prince Chula's dog called Tony.

Later life 

In 1938 he married Elizabeth Hunter, an English woman (known as Lisba). Their daughter, Mom Rajawongse Narisa Chakrabhongse, was born in 1956.
 They lived at Tredethy, St Mabyn, in Cornwall, in the 1940s and 1950s.

When Prince Chula's cousin Prince Birabongse Bhanudej ("B. Bira") went to England in 1927, Chula was supervising a racing team called White Mouse Racing. Prince Bira decided to drive for him.

In 1936 Chula's White Mouse team purchased an ERA for Bira, and he quickly became one of the leading exponents of this class of international racing. Bira's partnership with Chula ended in late 1948.

Prince Chula was the author of thirteen books, including a history of the Chakri dynasty, a biography about the race-car driver Richard Seaman and an autobiography.
One notable book Prince Chula wrote in 1935, “Wheels At Speed,” recorded his cousin Bira's first try as a race-car driver. The book was originally intended as a book for only friends and family, but after a few copies went public, interest in the book, increased. Publishers G. T. Foulis re-issued the book ten years after it was first written. MG aficionados will enjoy Wheels at Speed.

Prince Chula died of cancer in 1963 at the age of 55.

Honours

Thai
   Knight of The Most Illustrious Order of the Royal House of Chakri (19 February 1933)
   Knight Grand Cordon (Special Class) of The Most Illustrious Order of Chula Chom Klao
  Knight Grand Cordon (Special Class) of the Order of the White Elephant
  Knight Grand Cordon (Special Class) of the Order of the Crown of Thailand
   King Rama VI Royal Cypher Medal, Third Class
   King Rama VII Royal Cypher Medal, First Class
   King Rama VIII Royal Cypher Medal, First Class
   King Rama IX Royal Cypher Medal, First Class

Foreign
  Grand Cross of the Order of the White Lion (Czechoslovakia, 20 January 1938)
  Honorary Knight Grand Cross of the Royal Victorian Order (United Kingdom, 2 February 1938)
  Associate Officer Brother of the Order of St John (United Kingdom, 15 January 1960)

Works 
 Autobiography
 
 

 Other works

Ancestry

References

External links 
 

1908 births
1963 deaths
20th-century Thai historians
Alumni of Trinity College, Cambridge
Chakrabongse family
Knights Grand Cross of the Order of Chula Chom Klao
People educated at Harrow School
Thai male Mom Chao
Thai male Phra Ong Chao
Thai people of Ukrainian descent
20th-century Chakri dynasty